Spencer Park may refer to:

 Spencer Park, Western Australia, a northeastern suburb of Albany, Australia
 Spencer Park, New Zealand, a park north of Christchurch, New Zealand
 Spencer Park Dentzel Carousel, a carousel in Logansport, United States
 Spencer Smith Park, a park in Burlington, Canada
 Spencer Spit State Park, part of the Washington State Park System, United States
 Spencer Park, Queensland, stadium in Newmarket, Queensland